MTV Unplugged is the first live album recorded by Mexican singer-songwriter Julieta Venegas. The album features a selection of her greatest hits, along with new tracks, including the singles "El Presente" and "Algún Día". A handful of guest artists was included: Gustavo Santaolalla, Natalia Lafourcade, Cuarteto Latinoamericano,  La Mala Rodríguez.

This album received the Latin Grammy Award for Best Alternative Music Album and the DVD released from this live performance also won for Latin Grammy Award for Best Long Form Music Video. "El Presente" was nominated for Record of the Year and Song of the Year.

Album history 
The live performance of this album was recorded in Mexico City, on March 6, 2008 at the Estudios Churubusco, before 450 fans. This show was broadcast on July 5, 2008 through MTV Latin America, and premiered on June 12, 2008 on the MTV Tr3s. The recording includes collaborations from La Mala Rodríguez performing the hip-hop section of "Eres para mí"; two-time Oscar-winner Gustavo Santaolalla playing banjo on "Algún día"; Brazilian singer Marisa Monte performing in "Ilusion", a brand new song in Spanish and Portuguese; Jaques Morelenbaum participating in "Como sé"; and Natalia Lafourcade included as a part of Venegas's band. Julieta Venegas played the accordion, guitar, and piano. On the track "Esta vez", the Cuarteto Latinoamericano is included, and Juan Son (from the band Porter) joined Venegas on "De mis pasos". The violet dress that the artist wore during the performance was designed by Andrés Jiménez.

Jose Tillan served as the executive producer and producer (along with Michael Dagnery) for MTV Networks.

Track listing CD and DVD 
The track listing by iTunes Store Mexico.

Personnel 

 Gustavo Borner: Recording engineer, mixing, mastering. Mixed at: Igloo Music (Burbank, California)
 Juan Pablo Falluca: Mobile recording
 Juan Carlos Ertze: Recording assistant
 Gabriel Castanon: Recording assistant
 Daniel Castillo: Recording assistant
 Alberto Rodríguez: Recording assistant
 Joseph Greco: Mixing assistant
 Justin Moshkevich: Mixing assistant
 Nikolai Baxter: Mixing assistant
 Guillermo Gutiérrez: A&R direction
 Gilda Oropeza: A&R
 Charlie García: Coordination
 Reyna Espinoza: Coordination

Live crew

 Claudio Jiménez: Sound engineer
 Marco López: Sound engineer
 Marcos Juache: Stage
 Kike Sánchez: Stage
 Liz Gil: Stage manager
 Mannu Mannucci: Tour & personal manager

Design

 Alejandro Ros: Concept
 Silvia Canosa: Design
 Enrique Covarrubias: Cover photography
 Nicolás Turchetto: Back cover and live photos
 Yvonne Venegas: Rehearsal photos
 Karla Ortíz: Wardrobe
 Lorena Ortíz: Assistant
 Juan Chialvo: Assistant
 Corina Figueroa: Assistant

Musicians 
 La Mala Rodríguez: Vocal on "Eres Para Mí"
 Gustavo Santaollala: Banjo and vocal on "Algún Día"
 Juan Son: Vocal on "De Mis Pasos"
 Marisa Monte: Vocal on "Ilusión"
 Jaques Morelenbaum: Cello on "Cómo Sé"
 Cecilia Bastida: Piano, rhodes piano, clavinet, glockenspiel, vocals
 Natalia Lafourcade: Vibraphone, banjo, timple, musical saw, cavaquinho, glockenspiel, clavinet, vocals
 Mariana Baraj: percussion, vocals
 Sol Pereyra: Trumpet, cuatro, ukulele, vocals
 Edy Vega: drums, percussion
 Ariel Cavalieri: Double bass
 Silvano Zetina: Guitar, timple, vihuela, cavaquinho
 Juan Martín Medina: Flute, guitar
 Leandro Guffanti: Clarinet, saxophone
 Alejandro Díaz: Tuba
 Aron Bitran: Violin
 Saúl Bitran: Violin
 Javier Montiel: Viola
 Alvaro Bitran: Cello
 Julieta Venegas: Lead vocals, piano, accordion and guitar.

Chart and certifications
The album debuted at number 61 on the Mexican album charts, climbing to number-one the following week where it spent 10 consecutive weeks, replacing Para Siempre by Vicente Fernández and being replaced by A Little Bit Longer by Jonas Brothers. MTV Unplugged received a gold certification in México after two weeks of its release. In United States debuted and peaked at number 9 on the Billboard Top Latin Albums and at number 169 on the Billboard 200. It also peaked within the Top 20 in Spain and at number 39 in Switzerland.

Weekly charts

Certifications

Year-end chart

Awards

Latin Grammy Awards 

|-
| rowspan="4" style="text-align:center;"|2008
| rowspan="2"|"El Presente"
|Record of the Year 
|
|-
|Song of the Year
|
|-
| rowspan="2"|MTV Unplugged
| Best Alternative Music Album
|
|-
| Best Long Form Music Video
|
|-

Latin Billboard Awards 

|-
| rowspan="4" style="text-align:center;"|2009
| rowspan="2"| "El Presente"
| align=left| Hot Latin Song of the Year Female
|
|-
| align=left| Latin Pop Airplay Song of the Year, Female
|
|-
| rowspan="2"| MTV Unplugged
| align=left| Top Latin Album of the Year Female
|
|-
| align=left| Latin Rock/Alternative Album of the Year
|
|-

Release history

References 

Julieta Venegas live albums
Mtv Unplugged (Venegas, Julieta album)
2008 live albums
Latin Grammy Award for Best Alternative Music Album
Latin Grammy Award for Best Long Form Music Video
Spanish-language live albums